Comelico Superiore (Ladin: Cumelgu d Sora) is a comune (municipality) in the Province of Belluno in the Italian region Veneto, located about  north of Venice and about  northeast of Belluno, on the border with Austria.

Comelico Superiore borders the following municipalities: Auronzo di Cadore, Danta di Cadore, Kartitsch (Austria), San Nicolò di Comelico, Sexten.

References

Cities and towns in Veneto